Ljutice (Љутице) is a village in Serbia. It is situated in the Koceljeva municipality, in the Mačva District of Central Serbia. The village had a Serb ethnic majority and a population of 593 in 2002.

Historical population

1948: 1,297
1953: 1,303
1961: 1,219
1971: 1,110
1981: 972
1991: 755
2002: 593

References

See also
List of places in Serbia

Populated places in Mačva District